Barbatula potaninorum is a species of stone loach in the genus Barbatula.

Footnotes 

Balitoridae
Fish described in 2007